Ernzen is a small village in the commune of Larochette, in central Luxembourg.

References

 

In the south of Ernzen are active stone quarries, as well as ponds from former ones.

Mersch (canton)
Towns in Luxembourg